Tom Jones (November 28, 1916 – October 1984) was an American long-distance runner. He competed in the marathon at the 1952 Summer Olympics. He is the namesake of the Tom Jones Memorial held in his honor.

References

External links
 

1916 births
1984 deaths
Athletes (track and field) at the 1952 Summer Olympics
American male long-distance runners
American male marathon runners
Olympic track and field athletes of the United States
Sportspeople from Yonkers, New York
Track and field athletes from New York (state)
20th-century American people